AAFM may refer to:

 American Academy of Financial Management, a US-based board of standards, certifying body, and accreditation council
 Anthology of American Folk Music, a six-album compilation released in 1952